Pseudomalmea is a genus of flowering plants belonging to the family Annonaceae.

Its native range is Southern Tropical America.

Species:

Pseudomalmea boyacana 
Pseudomalmea darienensis 
Pseudomalmea diclina 
Pseudomalmea wingfieldii

References

Annonaceae
Annonaceae genera